USS Swatara may refer to:

  was a wooden, screw sloop, launched in 1865 and dismantled in 1872 to become the second ship of this name
  was a screw sloop, launched in 1873 and decommissioned in 1891

United States Navy ship names